This is a list of television programs in which one character was played by multiple actors. In numerous television programs, producers have cast multiple actors for the part of the same character. This list does not include different actors playing the same character at significantly different ages (as in flashbacks), but it does include actors playing the character continuously as the character ages. Actors are listed in chronological order, where possible. For a list specific to soap operas, see list of soap opera recasts.

#
The 4400. Character: Lily Tyler. Actresses: Laura Allen, Tippi Hedren.

A
 The A-Team (1983–1987). Character: Lt. Templeton "Faceman" Peck. Actors: Tim Dunigan (in the pilot), Dirk Benedict
 Adventures of Superman Character: Lois Lane. Actresses: Phyllis Coates, Noel Neill.
 The Adventures of William Tell (1950s). Character: Gessler's second in command, Frederick. Actors: Derren Nesbitt (first six episodes), Willoughby Gray (seventh episode), Jack Watling
 Alice Character: Tommy Hyatt. Actors: Alfred Lutter (pilot – carry-over from original movie Alice Doesn't Live Here Anymore), Philip McKeon (rest of series)
 All American Character: JP Keating. Actors: Elvis Nolasco (2018–2020), Ray Campbell (2021–)
 All in the Family 
 Character: Gloria Bunker. Actresses: Kelly Jean Peters (first pilot), Candice Azzara (second pilot), Sally Struthers. 
 Character: Lionel Jefferson. Actors: D'Urville Martin (pilots), Mike Evans.
 'Allo 'Allo! 
 Character: Captain Alberto Bertorelli. Actors: Gavin Richards (1987–1989), Roger Kitter (1991). 
 Character: Monsieur Ernest LeClerc. Actors: Derek Royle (1989), Robin Parkinson (1991–1992, 2007). 
 Character: Herr Otto Flick. Actors: Richard Gibson (1984–1992), David Janson (1992).
 Altered Carbon 
 Character: Takeshi Kovacs. Actors: Byron Mann (2134, Mercenary), Morgan Gao (Child Birth Sleeve), Will Yun Lee (2130, Birth Sleeve), Joel Kinnaman (2384, Elias Ryker sleeve), Jihae Kim (2414, Lounge Singer), Anthony Mackie (2414, combat sleeve)
 Character: Reileen Kawahara. Actors: Dichen Lachman (Birth Sleeve and several cloned sleeves), Riley Lai Nelet (Child), Arnold Pinnock (2384, As Hemingway), Anna Von Hooft (2384, As Clarissa Severin), Maddie Dixon-Poirier (2384, As Little Girl), Martha Higareda (While impersonating Kristin Ortega)
 American Housewife
 Character: Anna-Kat Otto. Actresses: Julia Butters, Giselle Eisenberg.
 Character: Taylor Otto. Actresses: Johnny Sequoyah (pilot only), Meg Donnelly.
 Another Period. Character: Hortence Bellacort. Actresses: Artemis Pebdani (pilot), Lauren Ash (first season), Lauren Flans.
 Arrow (2012–2020): Character: Sara Lance. Actresses: Jacqueline MacInnes Wood (pilot), Caity Lotz (seasons 2–8)

B
 Babylon 5. Character: Anna Sheridan. Actresses: Beth Toussaint, Melissa Gilbert.
 Back to You (2007–2008). Character: Gracie Carr. Actresses: Laura Marano, Lily Jackson.
 Barbary Coast. Character: Cash Conover. Actors: Doug McClure, Dennis Cole (Pilot only)
 Batman. 
Character: Catwoman. Actresses: Julie Newmar, Lee Meriwether (1966 film only), Eartha Kitt. 
Character: Riddler. Actors: Frank Gorshin and John Astin. 
Character: Mr. Freeze. Actors: George Sanders, Otto Preminger, and Eli Wallach
 Batwoman
Character: Kate Kane. Actresses: Ruby Rose, Wallis Day
 Being Human. 
Character: John Mitchell. Actors: Aidan Turner, Guy Flanagan (Pilot only). 
Character: Annie Sawyer. Actresses: Lenora Crichlow, Andrea Riseborough (Pilot only). 
Character: William Herrick. Actors: Jason Watkins, Adrian Lester (Pilot only). 
Character: Lauren Drake. Actresses: Annabel Scholey, Dominique McElligott (Pilot only)
 Bette. 
Character: Roy. Actors: Kevin Dunn and Robert Hays. 
Character: Rose. Actresses: Lindsay Lohan, Marina Malota
 Better Call Saul.
Character: Jeff. Actors: Don Harvey, Pat Healy
 The Beverly Hillbillies. Character: Jethro Bodine. Actors: Max Baer, Jr., Ray Young (The Return of the Beverly Hillbillies).
 Bewitched. 
Character: Santa Claus. Actors: Cecil Kellaway, Don Beddoe (1 episode each). 
Character: Darrin Stephens. Actors: Dick York (1964–1969), Dick Sargent (1969–1972). 
Character: Gladys Kravitz. Actresses: Alice Pearce (1964–1966), Sandra Gould (1966–1971). 
Character: Tabitha Stephens. Actresses: Cynthia Black (1966), Heidi and Laura Gentry (1966), Tamar and Julie Young (1966), Diane Murphy (1966–1968), Erin Murphy (1966–1972). 
Character: Louise Tate. Actresses: Irene Vernon (1964–1966), Kasey Rogers (1966–1972)
 Big Love.
 Character: Tancy Henrickson. Actresses: Jolean Wejbe (2006–2009), Bella Thorne (2010)
 Blake's 7. Character: Travis. Actors: Stephen Greif, Brian Croucher
 Boy Meets World. 
Character: Morgan Matthews. Actresses: Lily Nicksay (1993–1995), Lindsay Ridgeway (1995–2000). 
Character: Jedidiah Lawrence (Topanga's father). Actors: Peter Tork, Mark Harelik
 The Brady Bunch. 
Character: Marcia Brady. Actresses: Maureen McCormick, Leah Ayres (The Bradys). 
Character: Jan Brady. Actresses: Eve Plumb, Geri Reischl (The Brady Bunch Variety Hour). 
Character: Cindy Brady. Actresses: Susan Olsen, Jennifer Runyon (A Very Brady Christmas).
 Buffy the Vampire Slayer. Character: Nikki Wood. Actresses: April Weeden-Washington, K. D. Aubert

C
 Cadfael. Character: Hugh Beringar. Actors: Sean Pertwee (four episodes), Eoin McCarthy five episodes and Anthony Green for the final three episodes.
 Charmed. Character: Victor Bennett. Actors: Anthony Denison (one episode, where his last name was Halliwell), James Read
 Cheers. Character: Gary. Actors: Alternating between Joel Polis and Robert Desiderio
 Citizen Smith. Character: Charles “Charlie” Johnson. Actors: Arto Morris (pilot only), Peter Vaughan (Series 1–2), Tony Steedman (Series 3–4; 1980 Christmas special).
 The Count of Monte Cristo (1998). 
Character: Edmond Dantès. Actors: Gérard Depardieu and Guillaume Depardieu. 
Character: Mercedes Igualada. Actresses: Ornella Muti and Naike Rivelli
 The Crown.
Character: Queen Elizabeth II. Actresses: Claire Foy and Olivia Colman.
Character: Prince Philip, Duke of Edinburgh. Actors: Matt Smith and Tobias Menzies.
Character: Princess Margaret, Countess of Snowdon. Actresses: Vanessa Kirby and Helena Bonham Carter.
Character: Queen Elizabeth The Queen Mother. Actresses: Victoria Hamilton and Marion Bailey.
Character: Louis, Earl Mountbatten of Burma. Actors: Greg Wise and Charles Dance.
Character: Prince Edward, Duke of Windsor. Actors: Alex Jennings and Derek Jacobi.
Character: Wallis, Duchess of Windsor. Actresses: Lia Williams and Geraldine Chaplin.
Character: Antony Armstrong-Jones, Earl of Snowdon. Actors: Matthew Goode and Ben Daniels.
 Cuckoo. Character: Rachel Thompson. Actresses: Tamla Kari (series one), Esther Smith.

D
Dallas. 
Character: Miss Ellie Ewing. Actresses: Barbara Bel Geddes (1978–1984, 1985–1990) and Donna Reed (1984–1985). 
Character: Jenna Wade. Actresses: Morgan Fairchild, Francine Tacker and Priscilla Presley. 
Character: Kristin Stewart. Actresses: Mary Crosby and Colleen Camp.
Dark Shadows (1966–1971). Character: Willie Loomis. Actors: James Hall (4 episodes), John Karlen (106 episodes)
Days of Our Lives. Character: Roman Brady. Actors: Wayne Northrop, Josh Taylor
Diff'rent Strokes. Character: Maggie McKinney-Drummond. Actresses: Dixie Carter, Mary Ann Mobley.
dinnerladies. Character: Norman. Actors: Andrew Livingston (series 1), Adrian Hood (series 2).
Dr. Quinn, Medicine Woman. Character: Colleen Cooper. Actresses: Erika Flores, Jessica Bowman.
Doctor Who. 
Character: The Doctor. Actors: William Hartnell (1963–1966, 1973), Patrick Troughton (1966–1969, 1973, 1983, 1986), Jon Pertwee (1970–1974, 1983, 1993), Tom Baker (1974–1981), Peter Davison (1981–1984, 1993, 2007, 2022), Richard Hurndall (1983 – replacement for Hartnell), Colin Baker (1984–1986, 1993, 2022), Michael Jayston (1986), Sylvester McCoy (1987–1989, 1993, 1996, 2022), Paul McGann (1996, 2013, 2022), Christopher Eccleston (2005), David Tennant (2005–2010, 2013, 2022-), Matt Smith (2010–2013), John Hurt (2013), Peter Capaldi (2013–2017), David Bradley (2017, 2022, for Hartnell), Jodie Whittaker (2018–2022), Jo Martin (2020-2022).
Character: Romana. Actresses: Mary Tamm (1978–1979), Lalla Ward (1979–1981).
Character: The Master. Actors: Roger Delgado (1971–1973), Peter Pratt (1977), Geoffrey Beevers (1981), Anthony Ainley (1981–1989), Gordon Tipple (1996), Eric Roberts (1996), Derek Jacobi (2007), John Simm (2007–2010, 2017), Michelle Gomez (2014–2017).Sacha Dhawan (2020-2022).
Character: Rassilon. Actors: Richard Mathews, Timothy Dalton, Donald Sumpter, Don Warrington .
Character: Davros. Actors: Michael Wisher (1975), David Gooderson (1979), Terry Molloy (1982–1988), Julian Bleach (2008, 2015).
Character: River Song. Actresses: Alex Kingston, Sydney Wade, Nina Toussaint-White, Maya Glace-Green.
Character: Borusa. Actors: Angus MacKay (1976), John Arnatt (1978), Leonard Sachs (1983), Philip Latham (1983)
Character: The General. Actors: Ken Bones (2013–2015), T'Nia Miller (2015)
Character: Jamie McCrimmon. Actors: Frazer Hines, Hamish Wilson (only: The Mind Robber episodes 2–3)
I Dream of Jeannie. Character: Tony Nelson. Actors: Larry Hagman, Wayne Rogers (I Dream of Jeannie... Fifteen Years Later)
Dream of the Red Chamber. Character: Jia Yingchun. Actresses: Jin Lili and Mu Yi.
Dynasty. 
Character: Steven Carrington. Actors: Al Corley and Jack Coleman.
Character: Fallon Carrington Colby. Actresses: Pamela Sue Martin and Emma Samms. 
Character: Amanda Carrington. Actresses: Catherine Oxenberg and Karen Cellini. 
Character: Adam Carrington. Actors: Gordon Thomson and Robin Sachs (Dynasty: The Reunion).
Dynasty (2017 TV series).
Character: Alexis Carrington. Actresses: Nicolette Sheridan, Elizabeth Gilles (3 episodes in season 2), and Elaine Hendrix.
Character: Cristal Jennings. Actresses: Ana Brenda Contreras, Daniella Alonso

E
 Early Edition (1997–2000). Character: Marcia Roberts Hobson. Actresses: Marianne Hagan, Rya Kihlstedt. 
Eight Is Enough (1977–1981). 
Character: David Bradford. Actors: Mark Hamill (in the pilot), Grant Goodeve. 
Character: Abby Bradford. Actresses: Betty Buckley, Mary Frann (Eight Is Enough: A Family Reunion), Sandy Faison (An Eight Is Enough Wedding).

F
 The Facts of Life. Character: Monica Warner. Actresses: Pam Huntington, Marj Dusay.
 Falcon Crest. Character: Vicki Gioberti. Actresses: Jamie Rose, Dana Sparks
 The Fall and Rise of Reginald Perrin. Character: Reggie's son-in-law Tom. Actors: Tim Preece (series 1 and 2, 1976–77), Leslie Schofield (series 3, 1978–79). Preece returned to the role for the later series The Legacy of Reginald Perrin.
 Family Matters
Character: Harriette Winslow. Jo Marie Payton (1989–1997) and Judyann Elder (1997–1998)
 The Fosters. Character: Jesus Adams Foster. Actors: Jake T. Austin, Noah Centineo.
 The Fresh Beat Band. Character: Marina. Actresses: Shayna Rose, Tara Perry
 The Fresh Prince of Bel-Air. 
Character: Vivian Banks. Actresses: Janet Hubert-Whitten (1990–1993) and Daphne Maxwell Reid (1993–1996). 
Character: Nicky Banks. Actors: Gregory Wheeler, Ross Bagley.
 Frasier (1993–2004). 
Character: Frederick Gaylord Crane. Actors: Luke Tarsitano, Trevor Einhorn. 
Character: Nanny G (Nanette Guzman). Actresses: Dina Spybey, Laurie Metcalf, on Cheers played by Emma Thompson.
 Friends. 
Character: Ross' first ex-wife Carol Willick. Actresses: Anita Barone (1 episode), Jane Sibbett. 
Character: Mindy. Actresses: Jennifer Grey (1 episode), Jana Marie Hupp (1 episode)
 Fringe. Character: Michael / Anomaly XB-6783746. Actors: Spencer List (1 episode), Roman Longworth
 Full House. 
Character:  Michelle Elizabeth Tanner. Actresses: Ashley Olsen and Mary-Kate Olsen (contemporaneously due to child labor laws). 
Character: Harry Takayama. Actors: Nathan Nishiguchi and later recast on the 2016 reboot  Fuller House with Michael Sun Lee.

G

 Game of Thrones. 
Character: Daario Naharis. Actors: Ed Skrein, Michiel Huisman. 
Character: Gregor Clegane. Actors: Conan Stevens, Ian Whyte, Hafþór Júlíus Björnsson.
 Game On.
Character: Matthew Malone. Actors: Ben Chaplin, Neil Stuke.
 The George Burns and Gracie Allen Show. Character: Harry Morton. Actors: Hal March, John Brown, Fred Clark, Larry Keating
Ghost Whisperer. Character: Ned Banks. Actors: Tyler Patrick Jones and Christoph Sanders.
Ghostwriter. 
Character: Gaby Fernandez. Actresses: Melissa Gonzalez, Mayteana Morales. 
Character: Reggie Jenkins (Jamal's father). Actors: Samuel L. Jackson, Dean Irby. 
Character: Mr. Frazier (Lenni's father). Actors: Richard Cox, Keith Langsdale.
Gilligan's Island. Character: Ginger Grant. Actresses: Kit Smythe (pilot), Tina Louise, Judith Baldwin (Rescue From Gilligan's Island and The Castaways on Gilligan's Island), Constance Forslund (The Harlem Globetrotters on Gilligan's Island).
The Goldbergs. Character: Adam Goldberg. Actors: Sean Giambrone, Patton Oswalt (adult Adam narrating the episodes).
The Golden Girls. Character: Big Daddy. Actors: Murray Hamilton, David Wayne.
Character: Gloria. Actresses Doris Belack, Dena Dietrich.
Character: Dennis. Actors: Dennis Drake, Jonathan Perpich
Gotham (TV series). Character: Selina Kyle. Actresses: Camren Bicondova, Lili Simmons(finale only)
Grace Under Fire (1992–1998). 
Character: Patrick Kelly. Actors: Dylan and Cole Sprouse (contemporaneously due to child labor laws). 
Grounded For Life. Character: Dan O'Keefe. Actors: Floyd Van Buskirk (2001), Gregory Jbara (2002–2005).
Growing Pains (1985–1992). 
Character: Carol Seaver. Actresses: Elizabeth Ward (1985) (pilot, can be glimpsed in first episode wide shot), Tracy Gold (1985–92), Judith Barsi (1988) (1 episode flashback) 
Character: Chrissy Seaver. Actresses: Kirsten Dohring & Kelsey Dohring (1988–1990) (contemporaneously due to child labor laws), Ashley Johnson (1990–92), Khrystyne Haje (1990) (1 episode flash forward)
Character: Mike Seaver. Actor: Kirk Cameron (1985–1992), Victor DiMattia (1988) (1 episode flashback)

H
 Hamish Macbeth (1995–1997). Character: Lachlan McCrae, Sr. Actors: Jimmy Yuill (Series 1), Billy Riddoch (Series 2–3)
 Hannibal (2014–2015). Character: Mason Verger, Actors: Michael Pitt (Season 2), Joe Anderson (Season 3)
 Happy Days (1974–1984). 
Character: Chuck Cunningham. Actors: Gavan O'Herlihy, Randolph Roberts. 
Character: Dr. Mickey Malph. Actors: Jack Dodson, Alan Oppenheimer.
 Heroes. 
Character: Hiro Nakamura. Actors: Masi Oka (main actor), Garrett Masuda, Sekai Murashige and Mikey Kawata. The other actors were seen in the same time period with Masi Oka via time travel. 
Character: Charlie Andrews. Actresses: Jayma Mays, K Callan. 
Character: Molly Walker. Actresses: Adair Tishler (original series), Francesca Eastwood (Heroes: Reborn).

I
The Incredible Hulk (1977–1982). Character: Dr. David Banner/The Hulk. Actors: Bill Bixby (In form of David Banner) and Lou Ferrigno (In Hulk form). Ted Cassidy also did the voice of The Hulk.

J
The Jeffersons (1975–1985). 
Character: Lionel Jefferson. Actors: Mike Evans, Damon Evans. (Mike Evans returned for two more seasons after Damon Evans' departure)
Character: Mr. Whittendale. Actors: Ivor Francis, Jack Fletcher. 
Character: Allan Willis. Actors: Andrew Rubin, Jay Hammer.
Jonathan Creek — Character: Adam Klaus. Actors: Anthony Head (1997) and Stuart Milligan (1998–2013).

K
 Kangxi Dynasty. Character: Kangxi Emperor. Actors: Chen Daoming (Adult), Li Nan (Teenager), Chen Weichen (Child).
 Kasautii Zindagii Kay – The role of Anurag Basu was played by two actors.
 Keeping Up Appearances. Character: Rose. Actresses: Shirley Stelfox (1990), Mary Millar (1991–1995).
 The King of Queens – The role of Kirby Palmer was played by multiple child actors.

L
 Last Man Standing. 
Character: Boyd Baxter. Actors: Evan and Luke Kruntchev, Flynn Morrison, and Jet Jurgensmeyer.
Character: Kristin Baxter. Actresses: Alexandra Krosney and Amanda Fuller.
Character: Mandy Baxter. Actresses: Molly Ephraim and Molly McCook.
Character: Ryan Vogelson. Actors: Nick Jonas and Jordan Masterson.
 Last Tango in Halifax. Character: William. Actors: Edward Ashley and Dean Smith.
 Lexx. Character: Zev Bellringer/Xev. Actresses: Lisa Hines (beginning of episode 1 in series 1), Eva Habermann (series 1 and the first four episodes of series 2), Xenia Seeberg (series 2 through 4).
 Life Goes On. Character: Paige Thatcher. Actresses: Monique Lanier (1989–1990) and Tracey Needham (1990–1993).
 Lois & Clark: The New Adventures of Superman. 
Character: Jimmy Olsen. Actors: Michael Landes (1993–1994), Justin Whalin (1994–1997), Jack Larson (Episode: Brutal Youth).
Character: H. G. Wells. Actors: Terry Kiser, Hamilton Camp.
 Character: Lucy Lane. Actresses: Elizabeth Barones, Roxana Zal.
 The Lone Ranger. Character: The Lone Ranger. Actors: Clayton Moore (1949–1951, 1954–1957) and John Hart (1952–1953).

M
Mad About You. 
Character: Gus Stemple. Actors: John Karlen, Carroll O'Connor
 Character: Theresa Stemple. Actresses: Penny Fuller, Carol Burnett
 Mad Men. Character: Robert "Bobby" Draper. Actors: Maxwell Huckabee, Aaron Hart, Jared Gilmore
 Maude. 
Character: Carol Traynor. Actresses: Marcia Rodd (in the pilot), Adrienne Barbeau
 Character: Phillip Traynor. Actors: Brian Morrison, Kraig Metzinger
 Make Room For Daddy. Character: Terry Williams. Actresses: Sherry Jackson, Penney Parker
 M*A*S*H. 
Character: Father Francis Mulcahy. Actors: William Christopher, George Morgan
Character: Lt. Col. Donald Penobscott. Actors: Beeson Carroll, Mike Henry (American football)
 Me, Myself & I.
Character: Alex Riley. Actors: Jack Dylan Grazer, Bobby Moynihan, John Larroquette
 Mighty Morphin Alien Rangers. 
 Character: Tommy Oliver. Actors: Jason David Frank (as a teen) and Michael R. Gotto (as a child).
 Character: Rocky DeSantos. Actors: Steve Cardenas (as a teen) and Michael J. O'Laskey (as a child).
 Mixed-ish
 Character: Rainbow Johnson. Actresses: Arica Himmel, Tracee Ellis Ross(as an adult narrating the episodes, as well as being seen in flash-forwards, and in young Rainbow's mirror.).
 Monday Night RAW. Character: Doink the Clown. Actors: Matt Osborne, Steve Keirn (a "double Doink", concurrently with Osborne), Steve Lombardi, Ray Apollo.
 Monk. 
Character: Trudy Monk. Actresses: Stellina Rusich, Melora Hardin. 
Character: Benjy Flemming. Actors: Kane Ritchotte, Max Morrow. 
Character: Dale "The Whale" Biederbeck. Actors: Adam Arkin, Tim Curry, Ray Porter.
 The Munsters. Character: Marilyn Munster. Actresses: Beverly Owen, Pat Priest, Debbie Watson (Munster, Go Home!), Jo McDonnell (The Munsters' Revenge). In the pilot episode, the roles of Lily Munster and Eddie Munster were played by different actors.
 My Hero. Character: Thermoman. Actors: Ardal O'Hanlon, James Dreyfus.
 My Wife and Kids. 
Character: Claire. Actresses: Jazz Raycole, Jennifer Freeman.
Character: Vanessa. Actresses: Meagan Good (5 episodes), Brooklyn Sudano

N
Not Going Out. Character: Geoffrey Adams. Actors: Timothy West (Series 2–3), Geoffrey Whitehead (Series 4-)

O
 The Odd Couple. Character: Leonard Unger. Actors: Willie Aames, Leif Garrett.
 Once Upon a Time. Character: Henry Mills. Actors: Jared S. Gilmore, Andrew J. West.

P
Parker Lewis Can't Lose. Character: Parker's mother. Actors: Anne Bloom, Mary Ellen Trainor
Party of Five. Character: Owen Salinger. Actors: Alexander and Zachary Ahnert, Brendan and Tyler Porter, Andrew and Stephen Cavarno, and Jacob Smith.
The Partridge Family. Character: Chris Partridge. Actors: Jeremy Gelbwaks, Brian Forster
Pee-wee's Playhouse. Character: The King of Cartoons. Actors: Gilbert Lewis (first season), William H. Marshall (subsequent seasons)
Peter the Great. Character: Tsar Peter the Great. Actors: Maximilian Schell, Jan Niklas, Graham McGrath 
Petticoat Junction. 
Character: Bobbie Jo Bradley. Actresses: Pat Woodell, Lori Saunders
Character: Billie Jo Bradley. Actresses: Jeannine Riley, Gunilla Hutton, Meredith MacRae
Phyllis. Character: Julie Erskine. Actresses: Barbara Colby and Liz Torres
Picket Fences. Character: Myrian Wambaugh. Actresses: Ann Morgan Guilbert and Erica Yohn
Power Rangers Turbo. Character: Divatox and Dimitria. Actresses: Carol Hoyt and Hilary Shepard Turner. Hilary played in Turbo: A Power Rangers Movie, then replaced Carol after several episodes.
The Prisoner. Character: Number Six. Actors: Patrick McGoohan, Nigel Stock (episode "Do Not Forsake Me Oh My Darling") 
Private Practice. Character: Naomi Bennett. Actors: Merrin Dungey (in the backdoor pilot episode), Audra McDonald
Psych. 
Character: Bill Guster. Actors: Ernie Hudson (S2.E10), Keith David (S3.E9)
Character: Young Shawn. Actors: Josh Hayden (pilot), Kyle Pejpar (S1.E2), Liam James (S1-S5), Skyler Gisondo (S5-S8).
Character: Young Gus. Actors: Isaah Brown (S1), Carlos McCullers II (S2-S8)

R
 Red Dwarf. 
Character: Kristine Kochanski. Actresses: Clare Grogan, Chloë Annett. 
Character: Kryten. Actors: David Ross (one episode), Robert Llewellyn. 
Character: ship's computer, Holly. Actors: Norman Lovett during series I, II, VII and VIII, and Hattie Hayridge in series III to V
 Roseanne (1988–1997). 
Character: Rebecca "Becky" Conner-Healy. Actresses: Lecy Goranson (seasons 1–5 and 8), Sarah Chalke (seasons 6, 7, 8 as guest star, 9). 
Character: David Jacob "DJ" Conner. Actors: Sal Barone (in the pilot), Michael Fishman. 
Character: Lonnie Anderson. Actors: Josh C. Williams (1988–1989), Luke Edwards (1989), Kristopher Kent Hill (1991–1994).
Character: Audrey Conner. Actors: Ann Wedgeworth, Debbie Reynolds

S
 Saved by the Bell. Character: Derek Morris. Actors: Robert Pine, John Sanderford
 Seinfeld. 
Character: Frank Costanza (George's father). Actors: John Randolph, Jerry Stiller. 
Character: Morty Seinfeld (Jerry's father). Actors: Phil Bruns, Barney Martin. 
Character: Lloyd Braun. Actors: Peter Keleghan, Matt McCoy. 
Character: Newman. Actors: Larry David (voice only in one episode), Wayne Knight
 Serenade of Peaceful Joy. Character: Huirou (Princess Fukang). Actors: Ren Min (Adult), He Sitian (Teenager), Ren Feier (Pre-teen), Zhang Yuyi (Child), Su Yike (Toddler).
 Sense8. Character: Capheus "Van Damme" Onyango. Actors: Aml Ameen (2015), Toby Onwumere (2016)
 Sesame Street. 
Character: Gordon Robinson. Actors: Garrett Saunders (test pilots), Matt Robinson, Hal Miller, Roscoe Orman. 
Character: Miles Robinson. Actors: Miles Orman, Imani Patterson, Olamide Faison. 
Character: Gabi. Actors: Dick Maitland's son Bryan (born 1989), Gabriela Rose Reagan, Desiree Casado. 
Character: David Handord. Actors: Leonard Jackson (1989–1990), David Smyrl (1990–1998).
 Shameless. Character: Carl Gallagher. Actors: Luke Tittensor (2004), Elliott Tittensor (2004–present).
 Shazam! Character: Captain Marvel. Actors: Jackson Bostwick, John Davey
 The Six Million Dollar Man. 
Character: Bigfoot. Actors: André the Giant, Ted Cassidy. 
Character: Dr. Rudy Wells. Actors: Martin Balsam, Alan Oppenheimer, Martin E. Brooks.
 Smallville. Character: Morgan Edge. Actors: Rutger Hauer, Patrick Bergin.
 Spartacus. Character: Spartacus. Actors: Andy Whitfield (First season) and Liam McIntyre (Seasons third and fourth).
 Split. Character: Carmel. Actresses: Anna Zaikin (2009) and Agam Rodberg (2010–2012).
 Stargate SG-1. Character: Dr. Elizabeth Weir. Actresses: Jessica Steen (2 episodes), Torri Higginson
 The Son. Character: Eli McCulloch. Actors: Pierce Brosnan, Jacob Lofland
 Superboy. 
Character: Lex Luthor. Actors: Scott Wells (1988–1989) and Sherman Howard (1989–1992). 
Character: Superboy. Actors: John Haymes Newton (1988–1989) and Gerard Christopher (1989–1992)
 Supergirl. 
Character: Alura Zor-El. Actresses: Laura Benanti (2015–2017) and Erica Durance (2017–present). 
 Survivors. Character: Lizzie Willoughby. Actresses: Tanya Ronder (1975–1976) and Angie Stevens (1977).
 Sweet Valley High. Character: Todd Wilkins. Actors: Ryan Bittle (1994–1996) and Jeremy Garrett (1996–1997).
 Sydney to the Max. Character: Max Reynolds. Actors: Ian Reed Kesler(adult), Jackson Dollinger(child).

T
 'Til Death. Character: Allison Stark. Actresses: Krysten Ritter, Laura Clery, Lindsey Broad, Kate Micucci 
 That '70s Show. 
Character: Laurie Forman. Actresses: Lisa Robin Kelly, Christina Moore.
Character: Pamela Burkhart. Actresses: Eve Plumb, Brooke Shields
  The Andy Griffith Show.
 Character: Ben Weaver. Actors: Will Wright (until Wrights death in 1962), Tol Avery, Jason Johnson (Johnson played in five episodes of The Andy Griffith Show, but only played Ben Weaver in two).
 Character: Floyd Lawson. Actors: Walter Baldwin, Howard McNear
The Office. Character: Pam's Mother. Actresses: Shannon Cochran, Linda Purl
 The Prisoner. Character: Number Two. Actors: George Baker, David Bauer, Patrick Cargill, Georgina Cookson, Guy Doleman, Clifford Evans, Colin Gordon, Kenneth Griffith, Rachel Herbert, Leo McKern, Mary Morris, Derren Nesbitt, Eric Portman, Anton Rodgers, John Sharp, Andre Van Gyseghem, Peter Wyngarde.
 The Time Traveler's Wife (TV series)
 Character: Claire Abshire. Actresses: Rose Leslie(adult), Caitlin Shorey and Everleigh McDonnell(younger).
 Character: Henry DeTamble. Actors: Theo James(adult), Brian Artemus and Jason David(younger).
 This Is Us.
 Character: William Hill. Actors: Ron Cephas Jones, Jermel Nakia(as a young man)
 Character: Kate Pearson. Actresses: Chrissy Metz (as an adult in the present), Mackenzie Hancsicsak (as a child), Hannah Zeile (as a teen).
 Character: Kevin Pearson. Actors: Justin Hartley (as an adult in the present), Parker Bates (as a child), Logan Shroyer (as a teen).
 Character: Nick Pearson. Actors: Michael Angarano (as a young man), Griffin Dunne (present day)
 Character: Randall Pearson. Actors: Sterling K. Brown (as an adult in the present), Lonnie Chavis (as a child), Niles Fitch (as a teen).
 Too Close for Comfort. Character: Arthur Wainwright. Actors: Hamilton Camp, Graham Jarvis
 Two and a Half Men. Character: Delores Pasternak. Actresses: Missi Pyle, Alicia Witt.
 Two Guys and a Girl. Characters: Berg's Parents. Actors: Howard Hesseman, Steve Landesberg, Cheryl Ladd, Bo Derek
 True Blood. Character: James. Actors: Luke Grimes, Nathan Parsons

V
V. Character: Elizabeth. Actresses: Jenny Beck and Jennifer Cooke.
The Vampire Diaries. Character: Silas. Actors: Paul Wesley, Raymond Scott Parks, Jason Spisak, Camille Guaty, Jasmine Guy, David Alpay, Candice Accola, Steven R. McQueen, Claire Holt, Ian Somerhalder, Joseph Morgan, Zach Roerig, Marguerite MacIntyre, Matthew Davis and Nina Dobrev.

W
The Waltons. Character: John Boy. Actors: Richard Thomas, Robert Wightman, Earl Hamner Jr. (narrating the episodes)
The Wheel of Time. Character: Mat Cauthon. Actors: Barney Harris (Season 1), Dónal Finn (Season 2).
Wilfred. Character: Catherine Newman. Actresses: Mary Steenburgen, Mimi Rogers
WKRP in Cincinnati. Character: Mrs. Carlson. Actresses: Sylvia Sidney, Carol Bruce.
The Wonder Years. Character: Kevin Arnold. Actors: Fred Savage, Daniel Stern (adult Kevin narrating the episodes).
The Wonder Years (2021 TV series) Character: Dean Williams. Actors: Elisha "E. J." Williams, Don Cheadle (adult Dean narrating the episodes).
WWE Raw. Character: Samantha Orton. Actresses: Laura Croft, Samantha Speno (herself).
Wolfblood. Character: Dr. Rebecca Whitewood. Actresses: Effie Woods, Letty Butler

Y
Young Rock Character: Dwayne Johnson. Actors:Adrian Groulx, Bradley Constant, Uli Latukefu, and Dwayne himself.
Young Sheldon.
 Character: Sheldon Cooper. Actors: Iain Armitage, Jim Parsons (adult Sheldon narrating the episodes).
 Character: Amy Farrah Fowler. Actors: Lily Sanfelippo (1 episode), Mayim Bialik (adult Amy narrating 2 episodes).

Z
Z Nation Character: Lucy Murphy. Actors: Cora M. Abdallah, Madelyn Grace, Bea Corley, Caitlin Carmichael, Kelly Washington, Tara Holt, Sara Coates, Madonna Magee.

See also 
List of television actors who died during production

References

External links
TV's most memorable recastings

Lists of television shows